Lisinska planina (Serbian Cyrillic: Лисинска планина) is a mountain in southern Serbia, near the town of Bosilegrad. Its highest peak Valozi has an elevation of 1829 meters above sea level.

References

Mountains of Serbia